Robert Norman "Punk" Berryman (May 18, 1892 – May 18, 1966) was an American football player and coach. He played as a halfback at Pennsylvania State University and was selected as third-team All-American in 1915, his senior year.  Berryman served as the head football coach at Gettysburg College in 1916 and at Lafayette College in 1917.  He was subsequently an assistant football coach at the University of Iowa and Dickinson College. Berryman served as the head basketball coach at Iowa State University during the 1919–20 season; his team finished the season with an overall record of 6–12, placing seventh in the Missouri Valley Intercollegiate Athletic Association with a conference mark of 2–10. In 1922 and 1923 Berryman was an assistant coach at Colgate University under fellow Penn State alumnus, Dick Harlow. In 1924, he coached the Frankford Yellow Jackets, newly enfranchised to the National Football League (NFL), to a record of 11–2–1, good enough for only a third-place finish. The following season, Berryman coached the Millville Football & Athletic Club. In 1926, he coached the Brooklyn Lions to a record of 3–8 in their only season with the NFL.  Berryman was born on May 18, 1892.  He attended the Northeast Manual Training School in Philadelphia.  He died in May 1966.

Head coaching record

College football

College basketball

NFL

References

External links
 Punk Berryman at Pro-Football-Reference.com

1892 births
1966 deaths
American football halfbacks
Basketball coaches from Pennsylvania
Colgate Raiders football coaches
Dickinson Red Devils football coaches
Frankford Yellow Jackets coaches
Gettysburg Bullets football coaches
Iowa Hawkeyes football coaches
Iowa State Cyclones men's basketball coaches
Lafayette Leopards football coaches
Millville Football & Athletic Club players
Penn State Nittany Lions football players
Players of American football from Philadelphia
Educators from New York (state)
Educators from Pennsylvania
Coaches of American football from Pennsylvania